Dean Kent may refer to:

 Dean Kent (footballer) (born 1994), Australian footballer
 Dean Kent (swimmer) (born 1978), New Zealand swimmer